Scotties is a facial tissue brand originally owned by the Scott Paper Company, created in 1955.

Kimberly-Clark, owner of the rival Kleenex brand, acquired Scott Paper in 1997. For competitive reasons, it was required to resell the Scotties business in the U.S. and sold it to Irving Tissue while maintaining control of the trademark on the Scotties brand. Kruger Inc. separately acquired Scott's Canadian subsidiary, now known as Kruger Products, which sells Scotties tissues there.

The brand is well known in Canada for its sponsorship of the Scotties Tournament of Hearts, often simply called the Scotties.

References

External links
Scotties' facial tissue - United States
Scotties' facial tissue - Canada

Paper products
Personal care brands
1955 establishments in the United States